

335001–335100 

|-bgcolor=#f2f2f2
| colspan=4 align=center | 
|}

335101–335200 

|-bgcolor=#f2f2f2
| colspan=4 align=center | 
|}

335201–335300 

|-id=292
| 335292 Larrey ||  || Dominique-Jean Larrey (1766–1842), a surgeon of the great army of Napoleon. || 
|}

335301–335400 

|-id=306
| 335306 Mouhot ||  || Clement Mouhot (born 1978) is a French mathematician and academic. He is Professor of Mathematical Sciences at the University of Cambridge, and a fellow of King's College, Cambridge. His research is primarily in partial differential equations and mathematical physics. || 
|}

335401–335500 

|-bgcolor=#f2f2f2
| colspan=4 align=center | 
|}

335501–335600 

|-bgcolor=#f2f2f2
| colspan=4 align=center | 
|}

335601–335700 

|-bgcolor=#f2f2f2
| colspan=4 align=center | 
|}

335701–335800 

|-id=799
| 335799 Zonglü ||  || Zonglü, or Chinese windmill palm, is a palm native to tropical regions in East Asia. It is a popular ornamental plant in southern China. || 
|}

335801–335900 

|-id=853
| 335853 Valléedaoste ||  || Aosta Valley, a semi-autonomous region in northwestern Italy, and location of the  Astronomical Observatory of the Aosta Valley, active in scientific research, public outreach and education || 
|}

335901–336000 

|-bgcolor=#f2f2f2
| colspan=4 align=center | 
|}

References 

335001-336000